James Edwards was a member of the Los Angeles, California, Common Council—the legislative arm of that city— in 1860–61 and was its president for part of that term.

References

Data is from Chronological Record of Los Angeles City Officials,1850-1938, compiled under direction of Municipal Reference Library, City Hall, Los Angeles (March 1938, reprinted 1966). "Prepared ... as a report on Project No. SA 3123-5703-6077-8121-9900 conducted under the auspices of the Works Progress Administration."

Politicians from Los Angeles
Year of birth missing
Year of death missing